Satyendra  Narayan Mazumdar was an Indian politician. He was a Member of Parliament, representing West Bengal in the Rajya Sabha the upper house of India's Parliament as a member of the Communist Party of India.

References

Rajya Sabha members from West Bengal
Communist Party of India politicians from West Bengal